In the Shadow of the Chief is a Canadian documentary film, directed by Ivan Hughes and released in 2003. The film profiles the 1961 attempt of Ed Cooper and Jim Baldwin to climb the Stawamus Chief mountain near Squamish, British Columbia.

The film premiered at the 2003 Whistler Film Festival, where it was the winner of the Audience Award.

References

External links

2003 films
2003 documentary films
Canadian documentary films
2010s English-language films
English-language Canadian films
2010s Canadian films
Mountaineering films